A meeting and convention planner supervises and coordinates the strategic, operational, and logistical activities necessary for the production of events. The planner can be employed or hired ad hoc by corporations, associations, governments, and other organizations.

Standardization issues
 Although the Occupational Information Network (O*NET), sponsored by the United States Department of Labor and Employment and Training Administration, identified this occupation as "meeting and convention planner," other titles are more commonly used. These titles include event planner, meeting planner, and meeting manager. In addition, several other titles specific to the categories of events produced are used, such as corporate planner and party planner.
 The banquet event order (BEO), a standard form used in the hospitality industry to document the requirements of an event as pertinent to the venue, has presented numerous problems to meeting and convention planners due to the increasing complexity and scope of modern events. In response, Convention Industry Council developed the event specifications guide (ESG) that is currently replacing the BEO.
 Additionally, the Convention Industry Council is spearheading The Accepted Practices Exchange (APEX). By bringing the planners and suppliers together to create industry-wide accepted practices and a common terminology, the profession continues to enhance the professionalism of the meetings, conventions and exhibitions industry.

Certification and Designations
Planners can, but need not, be certified or hold designations.

Programs

See also
 Meeting Professionals International
 Professional Congress Organiser
 Event planning
 Event Planning and Production

Notes and references

External links

 Resources for the Meetings, Conventions & Exhibitions Industry (Source: Convention Industry Council)

Business occupations